Doha News is an online news blog started in March 2009 by two American journalists, Shabina Khatri and Omar Chatriwala. It is based in Qatar and provides its readers with daily reports on breaking domestic and international news stories. It gained considerable popularity in May 2012 when it became the first news outlet in Qatar to report on the Villagio Mall fire.

Development history

In March 2009, Shabina Khatri created the Doha News account on Twitter. She and her husband, Omar Chatriwala, went on to launch a stand-alone website. It was the first digital news outlet established in the country. They have stated that their aim is to create a media platform in which they could engage the audience in a manner dissimilar to traditional forms of media.

Doha News quickly increased in popularity due to its coverage of controversial local events not as widely reported in government-run media, with a notable instance being the May 2012 Villagio Mall fire in which 19 people were killed. It succeeded in obtaining and releasing verifiable figures and facts, such as the identities of the victims of the fire, whereas many other forms of online media reported unverified rumors. It experienced a massive increase in visitors during the event, increasing from about 10,000 visitors a day to 100,000 visitors a day. On the contrary, traditional media was criticized for its late and minimal coverage of the incident.

Another sensitive story published by the website centered on the rape and prosecution of Qatari resident Marte Dalelv in the United Arab Emirates. It was not mentioned in print media, but appeared in international publications such as The New York Times after Doha News published a news article on the case. Similarly, after the murder of Lauren Patterson in October 2013, it was the most notable Qatari media outlet to report on the killing and some of its work was quoted in international newspapers.

Content
Social issues such as alcohol, dress codes and other cultural issues often generate the most popularity in terms of visitors and comments. Criticism has been leveled by nationals who allege that the content disproportionately focuses on the negative aspects of Qatar. A commenting policy and stricter moderation of comments was introduced after the comments section witnessed an increase in offensive remarks.

Censorship
Doha News has provided coverage on a range of controversial subjects in recent years. Although the couple have not experienced any reprisals by the government, they claim that there are obstacles to obtaining reliable information. In February 2013, the site was prevented from reporting on the court proceedings of the Villagio Mall fire. During the hearing, the presiding judge asked the court whether there were any journalists present. After Shabina Khatri and another journalist confirmed that they were media personalities, the judge told them that they had to submit a request for permission to report on the hearings. After Khatri submitted the request, the judge responded by informing her that she was required to prove that Doha News was an official media outlet.

References

External links
Official website

Mass media in Doha
Qatari news websites
Internet properties established in 2009
2009 establishments in Qatar